Aghcheh Dizej (also Romanized as Āghcheh Dīzej; also known as Āghjeh Dīzaj, Āghjeh Dīzeh, Āqchehdīzeh, and Āqjeh Dīzeh) is a village in Sarajuy-ye Jonubi Rural District, Saraju District, Maragheh County, East Azerbaijan Province, Iran. At the 2006 census, its population was 343, in 61 families.

References 

Towns and villages in Maragheh County